Placental protein 13 (PP13) is a protein that in humans is encoded by the LGALS13 gene.

Structure and function

Function 

It is composed of two identical subunits which are held together by disulfide bonds. The monomer of this protein has structural similarity to several members of the beta-galactoside-binding S-type lectin family, but it could not bind beta-galactoside. This is because the ligand binding site is lack of key residue for binding beta-galactoside. It is a galectin-like protein. The ligand of this protein is still unknown.

Clinical significance
PP13 levels that are low in the first trimester of pregnancy confers a higher risk for developing pre-eclampsia later in pregnancy.

References

External links